Norman Regional Hospital is a 324-bed general hospital that serves Norman, Oklahoma and the surrounding communities. Founded in 1946 as Norman Municipal Hospital, Norman Regional has since become one of the state's busiest hospitals, with its emergency department receiving more than 70,000 annual visitors.

History 
Norman Regional Hospital was founded on 2 June 1946 as Norman Municipal Hospital. The 61 bed facility was funded through bonds and a grant from the Federal Works Agency. Norman Municipal changed its name to Norman Regional in 1984.

Medical Services 
 Emergency Department
 Stroke Center
 Surgical Services
 Cancer Services
 Imaging Services

References 

Hospital buildings completed in 1946
Hospitals in Oklahoma
Municipal hospitals